This is a list of the busiest airports in the Dominican Republic by passenger traffic, a statistic available for almost all the airstrips taken into account. The present list intends to include all the international airports located in the country.

List of airports
Ordered by total passenger traffic, international and domestic, with final data for 2019.

2020 

Source: Banco Central República Dominicana year 2020

Other years 
Ordered by total passenger traffic, international and domestic, with final data for years between 2005 and 2019.

2019 

Source: Banco Central República Dominicana year 2019

2018 

Source: Banco Central República Dominicana year 2018

2017

Source: Banco Central República Dominicana year 2017

2016

Source: Banco Central República Dominicana year 2016

2015

Source: Banco Central República Dominicana year 2015

2014

Source: Banco Central República Dominicana year 2014

2013

Source: Banco Central República Dominicana year 2013

2012

Source: Banco Central República Dominicana year 2012

2011

Source: Banco Central República Dominicana year 2011

2010

Source: Banco Central República Dominicana year 2010

2009

Source: Banco Central República Dominicana year 2009

2008

Source: Banco Central República Dominicana year 2008

2007

Source: Banco Central República Dominicana year 2007

2006

Source: Banco Central República Dominicana year 2006

2005

Source: Banco Central República Dominicana year 2005

See also

Aviation in the Dominican Republic
Airports, busiest
Dominican Republic